WGTY (107.7 FM, "Froggy 107.7") is a country music formatted radio station. Owned by Forever Media, through licensee FM Radio Licenses, LLC, it is licensed to Gettysburg, serving Adams County and York County in Pennsylvania. It was formerly called "Great Country 107.7."

History
WGTY-FM was an automated Beautiful Music station for many years, a forgotten companion to the full-service WGET 1320. In early 1984, Rick McCauslin, then a sales rep for WGET/WGTY was promoted to General Manager, replacing the long-time GM, Richard Selby. Rick's plan was to investigate the possibility of changing WGTY-FM to a live Country station, as the York/Adams County area only really had one Country station serving it, Z-107, broadcasting out of the Harrisburg area. Rick hired Wally Daniels as the PD for both stations, tasking him with building the Country station. Wally was doing 6PM - Midnight on the WGET side for a time before being moved to the FM side. Rick & Wally began building the new WGTY airstaff and when finished, it was:

Wally Daniels 6A - 10A
Dave "Boom Boom" Cannon 10A - 3P
Rick Davis (Rick McCauslin) 3P - 7PM
Pat Case 7P - Midnight

The station signed off at midnight in those days. Dave Cannon was the Music Director and helped to establish WGTY's Country library. On November 11, 1984, at 6 AM, WGTY officially began its new life as "Country FM 108". Its first song at 6 AM that day was "Sweet Country Music" by Atlanta. The station took off quickly and has never looked back. After going live, WGET was then turned into the automated side of the house.

According to the Arbitron Ratings company, WGTY has been the #1 station in the York, Pennsylvania market for persons over 12 for over five years. It is also the premier country music outlet servicing both Adams and York counties clearly.

Many personalities have appeared on WGTY over the years - most notable are Dave "Boom Boom" Cannon, Kim Alexander, Scott Donato, John "Paesan" Pellegrini, Brad Austin, Dan Douglas and Jeff Diggs.

There have been several successful morning show campaigns at 107.7.  John "Paesan" Pelligrini was the first to garner respectable ratings in the market in the early 1990s, first by himself, then later adding Kim Alexander as a full-time morning partner.  Alexander had been full-time on sister station WGET.  When Pelligrini moved to afternoons in the mid-2000s, the "Austin & Alexander" show debuted, as Brad Austin took over for Paesan as program director and morning show co-host (he had been the afternoon personality).  After a very successful run in the morning with Kim Alexander, Brad Austin left and was replaced by Scott Donato (formerly of 98YCR and other stations), both as morning show host and program director. "Kim and Scott in the Morning," which debuted in May 2007, has not only remained the #1 morning show in the market since, but it has reached ratings heights never seen before in the morning.  In the spring of 2009, the station registered the first "12" share in the York market in ages, scoring a 12.4 rating (12+) demo, which was the station's highest rating in history.  The station, to date, is still #1 in the market for stations of its type.  Scott Donato was promoted to operations manager of both WGET and WGTY in February 2010.

On January 4, 2016, the station's branding was changed over to "Froggy 107.7".  The branding change was a result of Forever Media purchasing the station a month prior.  While the station endured the usual listener grumblings that come with a branding change, the station's formatics weren't affected much, as WGTY retained most of its staff and features.  Davy "Croakett", a longtime radio veteran in the area, moved over from sister station 98.5 to take over afternoons on Froggy.  Even with the changes, the station has remained the #1 station in the nielsen ratings consistently through current day (2021).

Ownership
WGTY's former parent company, Times and News Publishing is a family business which dates back to the middle of the twentieth century.  Co-owned under the Times and News umbrella were sister station WGET (AM) and The Gettysburg Times newspaper.  The management team at Times and News Publishing is based out of Gettysburg, and the company itself is owned by Phil Jones. Jones serves as the chairman of the company's board of directors.  Cindy Ford is currently serving as the president for Times and News Publishing and is also the day-to-day general manager of WGET and WGTY Radio.  Tom Ford is the general manager of the Gettysburg Times.

WGTY was sold to Forever Media's FM Radio Licenses, LLC effective December 1, 2015, at a purchase price of $4.25 million.

References

External links
WGTY website

GTY
Country radio stations in the United States
Radio stations established in 1977
1977 establishments in Pennsylvania